Azareen Van der Vliet Oloomi is an Iranian-American writer. She won a 2015 Whiting Award, and the 2019 PEN/Faulkner Award for Fiction.

Life 
She graduated from  Brown University; and University of California, San Diego. She teaches at University of Notre Dame.

Her interviews appear in the Los Angeles Review of Books.
She married Leonardo Francalanci.

Works

References 

Living people
PEN/Faulkner Award for Fiction winners
American people of Iranian descent
21st-century American women writers
Brown University alumni
University of California, San Diego alumni
University of Notre Dame alumni
Year of birth missing (living people)